Theodis Kain Colter (born October 3, 1990) is a former American football player who played multiple positions for the Northwestern Wildcats, mostly as a quarterback and wide receiver. Colter is also a co-founder of the College Athletes Players Association, or CAPA, which is a labor organization established to assert college athletes' status as employees with the right to collectively bargain for basic protections.

High school career
Colter attended Cherry Creek High School in Denver, Colorado, where he was the team captain and a four-year letterwinner. He was also a three-time All-Centennial League selection. As a sophomore, he threw for 2,073 yards, ran for 463 and had 25 touchdowns. Playing a full season as a junior, he led the Bruins (11-3 in 2008) to the 5A state championship game as he threw for 1,786 yards, ran for 937 and accounted for 31 touchdowns. As a senior, he missed eight-plus games with a shoulder injury that limited his throwing, but still managed to finish with 907 passing yards and 978 rushing yards with 16 total touchdowns. In the quarterfinal game vs. defending state champ Grandview High School, he ran 36 yards for the game-winning double OT score on a third-and-goal play. Colter also lettered three years in basketball (playing point guard) and four years in track & field (competing in long jump and triple jump).

As a high school senior at Cherry Creek High School, Colter was rated as a three-star quarterback prospect by Rivals.com. He was an All-Region quarterback according to SuperPrep All-Midlands, PrepStar All-Midlands Region and Rivals.com. He was ranked 52nd nationally among all athletes by Rivals.com, 49th nationally among all quarterbacks by SuperPrep and 56th regionally (nine states) among all players by SuperPrep. He also ranked seventh among all players in the state of Colorado by Rivals.com and SuperPrep.

Colter committed to Northwestern University on January 14, 2010. Colter also received football scholarships from Air Force, Akron, Arizona State, Colorado, Colorado State and Stanford.

In 2009, Kain Colter led a comeback against the then #1 Columbine High School Rebels, which ended in a game-winning field goal. He then moved to the 5A Colorado High School Championship Game against Mullen High School.

College career

2010
As a true freshman, Colter made his first college start for the Wildcats, as a slotback, in the 2011 TicketCity Bowl.

2011
As a sophomore, Colter was slated to be the backup quarterback to Dan Persa, as Persa was questionable for the team's opening game with an Achilles tendon injury. In the opening game against Boston College, Persa was not healthy enough to start, and Colter became the starting quarterback, leading the Wildcats to a 24-17 victory over the Eagles of Boston College. The Wildcats' head coach, Pat Fitzgerald, said that once Persa returns, Colter will be used as a running back, wide receiver and Wildcat quarterback.

Statistics

Professional career
Colter went undrafted in the 2014 NFL Draft but was later signed by the Minnesota Vikings as a wide receiver and running back. Colter didn't make the Vikings' 53-man roster, but he made the practice squad.

On February 9, 2016, Colter signed with the Los Angeles Rams, but he was subsequently released.

On August 1, 2016, the Buffalo Bills announced that they signed Colter. On September 2, 2016, he was released by the Bills as part of final roster cuts.

References

External links
 Northwestern profile

Living people
American football quarterbacks
American football wide receivers
Northwestern Wildcats football players
Minnesota Vikings players
Los Angeles Rams players
1990 births
Players of American football from Denver